Karolína Plíšková was the defending champion, but chose to participate in Korea Open, instead.

Naomi Osaka became the first Japanese player to win the tournament in 24 years, defeating Anastasia Pavlyuchenkova in the final, 6–2, 6–3.

Seeds
The top four seeds received a bye into the second round.

Draw

Finals

Top half

Bottom half

Qualifying

Seeds

Qualifiers

Lucky losers

Draw

First qualifier

Second qualifier

Third qualifier

Fourth qualifier

Fifth qualifier

Sixth qualifier

References

External links
Main Draw
Qualifying Draw

Singles